Moi et l'autre (also rendered as Moi... et l'autre) was a Quebec French sitcom broadcast on Radio-Canada between 1966 and 1971. The series starred Denise Filiatrault and Dominique Michel as best friends who were roommates at a Montreal apartment. The series tells of the ladies' numerous, often absurd, adventures, often with Denise as the perpetrator.

Moi et l'autre was Radio-Canada's first program to be broadcast in colour, after colourcasting began in Canada in 1966; however, some episodes of this series exist today only as black and white recordings.

From 1995 to 1997, a revival series was broadcast on Radio-Canada; the new series was written by Filiatrault and featured the same cast as the original series, except for Jean-Paul Dugas (who did not participate) and Réal Béland (who died in 1983; his role was played by Martin Drainville as Gustave Jr.).

Cast
 Denise Filiatrault -- Denise Létourneau
 Dominique Michel -- Dominique André
 Roger Joubert -- M. Jean-Paul Lavigueur, building manager
 Réal Béland -- Gustave Landreville, doorman
 Jean-Paul Dugas -- François Dupuis, Dominique's boyfriend (1969-1971)

References

External links
 Cinémathèque québécoise - Répertoire audiovisuel Québec: Moi et l'autre

1966 Canadian television series debuts
1971 Canadian television series endings
1960s Canadian sitcoms
1970s Canadian sitcoms
Television shows filmed in Montreal
Ici Radio-Canada Télé original programming